Bossa Nova Hotel is the 1983 debut album of rock singer/guitarist Michael Sembello. The album was a continuation of the work that Sembello began with producer Phil Ramone on "Maniac," which became a number one US pop hit after it was featured in the film Flashdance and on its soundtrack album. Bossa Nova Hotel peaked at number 80 on the US album chart and included the soundtrack hit in addition to two more chart entries, "Automatic Man" and "Talk."

Background
Songwriters Michael Sembello and Dennis Matkosky recorded a demo of a song titled "Maniac" that they had written after Matkosky watched a news report about a serial killer, and the tape landed in the hands of Phil Ramone, who was looking for songs to use in the film Flashdance. After changing the lyrics, a new version of "Maniac" recorded by Sembello was released on the soundtrack album and went to number one on the Billboard Hot 100 in the summer of 1983. The singer-songwriter chose to work with Ramone on his debut album because he felt they were a good match. Having worked with so many producers over the years as a session musician, he knew how inflexible they could be, but Ramone was different. "Phil is just about as nuts as I am and will try anything, which is great." On the material itself, he said, "I wanted to take some of the elements of Brazilian music and fuse them with pop,… kind of the way The Police have done with reggae."

Release and reception
Bossa Nova Hotel was released by Warner Bros. Records in September 1983 and debuted on Billboard magazine's Top LPs & Tape chart in the issue dated October 8. During a 10-week run, it reached number 80.

"Automatic Man", the first official single from the album, debuted on the Billboard Hot 100 in the September 24, 1983, issue, and peaked at number 34 over the course of 10 weeks. The second single – a duet with his wife Cruz called "Talk" – started its 10 weeks on the magazine's Adult Contemporary chart in the February 4, 1984, issue and got as high as number 25.

J. D. Considine wrote in Musician: "You could sum up Sembello's sound as Michael McDonald with a rhythm machine, but that would be unnecessarily cruel to McDonald. And the rhythm machine."

The album was re-issued in 2007 on CD by Wounded Bird Records.

Track listing

Charts

Personnel
Michael Sembello - lead vocals, bass synth, bass, guitar, marimba solo, synthesizers, acoustic guitar, LinnDrum, Fender Rhodes
Danny Sembello - bass synth, tack piano solo, keyboards, synthesizers, marimba, acoustic piano
Vinnie Colaiuta - drums
Nathan Watts - bass
Paulinho Da Costa - percussion
Carlos Vega - drums, Simmons drums
Don Freeman - keyboards
Larry McNeely - banjo
Chris Page - additional synthesizer
Cruz Baca Sembello - guest vocals on "Talk"
Dennis Matkosky - keyboards, synthesizers
George Duke - synthesizer solo 
Dennis Karmazyn - cello
Oscar Castro-Neves - string arranger, conductor
Michael Sembello, John Sembello, Danny Sembello, Cruz Baca Sembello, Liza Miller - background vocals
Jerry Hey, Gary Herbig, Gary Grant, William Reichenbach - horns
Technical
Phil Ramone – producer
Michael Sembello – producer ("Maniac")
Thom Wilson, Jim Gallagher, Peter Chaikin - recording engineers
Tommy Vicari - mixing
Bernie Grundman - mastering
Richard Seireeni, Simon Levy - art director
John Colao - photography

References

Bibliography

 

1983 debut albums
Albums produced by Phil Ramone
Michael Sembello albums
Warner Records albums